Mainpuri is a city in Mainpuri district in the Indian state of Uttar Pradesh. It is the administrative headquarters of Mainpuri district and is situated to the north-east of Agra and is 270 km from New Delhi. Mainpuri forms part of the ancient legendary region of Lord Krishna's land called Braj.

Geography
Mainpuri railway station is the nearest railway station. The closest civil airport is at Agra, which is 121 km away. There are two rivers in Mainpuri, Ishan and Arind or Rind (a tributary of the river Yamuna) which is a small stream originating from Aligarh.

Climate

Demographics

As per provisional data from the 2011 census, Mainpuri urban agglomeration had a population of 133,078, of which males were 69,788 and females were 63,290. The literacy rate was 85.66 per cent.

In Mainpuri District the total population is 12.3 lakh in which voters for Yadav constitute 3 lakh, followed by Lodhi Rajput with 2.6 lakh and 2 lakh Jatav and other.
 India census, Mainpuri had a population of 89,535. Males constitute 53% of the population and females 47%. In Mainpuri, 15% of the population is under 6 years of age. Kannauji and Braj Bhasha are used in day-to-day communication.

Notable temples
There are several ancient and well-known Hindu temples in the city. These include Sheetla Devi Temple which hosts a 20-day rural exhibition-cum-trade fair every year in March/April. Bhimsen Mandir is an ancient Shiva temple and Falahari Ashram situated on Jyoti-Devi Road has very a rare statue of the goddess Durga with 18 arms. Another ancient Shiv temple is Chandeshwar Mandir situated on Chandeshwar Road. Also located on Devi Road are the twin Shiv temples of Kale Mahadev and Shweat Mahadev. Hanuman Temple situated on old Tehsil Road is visited by thousands on Tuesdays and Saturdays.

Industry
Cotton ginning, oilseed milling, lamp and glass manufacturing constitute the prominent industries. Peanut farming is a small but well-spread out industry. The town is also renowned for its tobacco and wooden sculptures. A large amount of the population depends on agriculture produce to fulfill daily needs. The agricultural equipment industry is predominant — Siyaram Agency is one of the leading equipment manufacturers in the district.

Places of interest

Fort/Garhi of Mainpuri is situated at old Mainpuri. The fort is not a spot of tourist interest. It is the private property of erstwhile raja of two estates, Mainpuri and Lawan (Dausa, Rajasthan) and repaired, maintained and restored by him.

Attractions include the parks Phoolbagh and Lohia Park. Phoolbagh is situated at Jail Chauraha while Lohia Park is situated at District Collectorate. Both have green lawns and fountains.

Mainpuri is also known for the sarus crane (Grus antigone). This bird, called krouncha in India, is revered as a symbol of marital fidelity and is celebrated in myth and legend. There are estimated to be 8,000-10,000 sarus cranes in India. Two-thirds of its population resides in the villages Harwai,Andani of Karhal.

Another place of interest in the Mainpuri District is the Saman Bird Sanctuary. The Siberian crane comes here in its migration cycle and stays for 3–4 months from November to February. Part-time wildlife photographer Mr. Shashank Raghav has contributed his photos to depict the wildlife of the Mainpuri District, especially the different species of birds which can be found in nearby areas of the Saman Bird Sanctuary within the Mainpuri district.

Villages

Aryapur Khera
Baghirua
Pusaina
Bhangwat
Rampura
Bhogaon
Ganeshpura

Health care
The district hospital is called Maharaja Tej Singh Jila Chikitsalya. Mainpuri Janch Kendra is a Registered Pathology in the district in the fields of biotechnology and biochemistry. Mainpuri District has a very high number of cancer patients due to consumption of kapuri (camphor) flavoured tobacco.

Engineering College
Government Engineering College, Mainpuri(खर्रा)) (Rajkiya Engineering College, REC) is a government engineering college in Mainpuri. It is a constituent college of Dr. A.P.J. Abdul Kalam Technical University (formerly Uttar Pradesh Technical University) in Lucknow. The college has three branches: civil, electrical, and mechanical with 63 students in each branch. REC is situated at Shikohabad - Mainpuri Road. There is one government polytechnic college. It has three branches of engineering, electronics, microprocessors and instrumentation and control. It is located at Sindhiya Tiraha near new Mandi.

Accessibility
Mainpuri is well-connected to other parts of the state by road and broad-gauge railway so one can visit Mainpuri by train. Currently, the only two trains are the Kalindi Express and the Kanpur Anand Vihar Express, which connect Mainpuri to Delhi and Kanpur. The city is also linked by railways to Farrukhabad and Shikohabad, Etawah and Kanpur. Major cities within a  range of Mainpuri include Agra, Delhi, Bareilly, Meerut, Firozabad, Shikohabad, Etawah, Jhansi, Gwalior and Kanpur.

The Agra Lucknow Expressway connects Mainpuri to Lucknow.

See also
 List of cities in Uttar Pradesh
 Mainpuri (Lok Sabha Constituency)
 List of Villages in Mainpuri District

References

External links
 Mainpuri District official web site

 
Cities in Uttar Pradesh